The Nine Lives of Tomas Katz is a 2000 Anglo-German black and white surreal comedy. It has been described as an "avant-garde comedy about the Apocalypse", co-written and directed by Ben Hopkins.

Premise
On the last day of creation, a stranger arrives in London. No one knows who he is or where he has come from but by the time he leaves, the entire universe will have been erased.

Cast
 Tom Fisher as No / Tomas Katz
 Ian McNeice as Inspector 
 Tony Maudsley as Taxi Driver
 Sachiko Hidari as Cuthbert Will Keen
 Andrew Melville as Minister of Fish
 Toby Jones as Civil Servant
 Asif Kapadia as Gwupigrubynudnylandian
 Kris Krishnamma as Gwupigrubynudnylandian
 Jamille Jinnah as Gwupigrubynudnylandian
 Sophie Bevan as Journalist
 Trevor Thomas as Schlauch
 Amelia Curtis as Underworld Announcer
 Tilly Blackwood as Underworld Secretary
 David de Keyser as Exhumed Rabbi
 John Ramm as Ivul Gurk
 Janet Henfrey as Janice Waily
 Boyd Clack as Abel Mularchy
 Tara Savage as Radiator Child
 Callum Savage as Radiator Child
 Oliver Parkes as Drumchild
 Andrew Kötting as Taxi Driver
 Graham Lawson as axi Driver
 Joseph Greig as Astral Guide
 Tim Barlow as Mr. Browne
 Joan Oliver as Care Worker
 Colin Weatherall as Bank Clerk
 Sean Albuquerque as Geoff Plow
 Jason Thorpe as Officer Willis
 Togo Igawa as Japanese Scuba Diver
 Kiki Kendrick as Suburban Mum
 Stephen Pye as Suburban Son
 Yvette Richardson as Police Secretary
 Francesca Dowd as Tea Lady
 Sadie Walters as Tea Lady
 Thomas Q. Napper as Man Falling During 'Gripped'
 Paul Ritter as Dave
 Steven O'Donnell as Keith
 Noah Taylor as Hyde Park Nutter
 David Farr as Hyde Park Nutter
 Kim Noble as Hyde Park Nutter
 Tim Potter ad Apocalyptic Nutter
 Andrew Harrison as Voice
 India Martin as Voice
 Josh De La Mare as Voice
 Luke Morris as Voice
 Catherine Gosling Fuller as Voice
 Andy Lane as Voice

Critical response
Peter Bradshaw wrote in The Guardian, "a distinctively English, rather than simply British, movie in its loopy, diverting surrealism...Nothing so obvious as a plot is allowed to cramp this movie's style as it swoops weirdly across the dream landscape of London like a demented, dishevelled bird." George Perry wrote on BBC Films, "this has to be one of the strangest films of the year, a weird apocalyptic vision shot in the most mundane of London surroundings, with all too obvious budgetary constraints pushed asunder by the sheer energy of the director's imagination."

Awards
The film was the winner of the Evening Standard Best Newcomer Award 2000, for director Ben Hopkins.

References

External links
 
 

2001 films
2000s avant-garde and experimental films
Apocalyptic films
British avant-garde and experimental films
British independent films
Films scored by Dominik Scherrer
Films set in London
German comedy films
English-language German films
Surreal comedy films
2000s English-language films
British comedy films
2000s British films
2000s German films